The Soyuz-T (Union-T) spacecraft was the third generation Soyuz spacecraft, in service for seven years from 1979 to 1986.  The T stood for transport.  The revised spacecraft incorporated lessons learned from the Apollo Soyuz Test Project, Soyuz 7K-TM and Military Soyuz.

The Soyuz-T was a major upgrade over previous Soyuz spacecraft, sporting solid-state electronics for the first time and a much more advanced onboard computer to help overcome the chronic docking problems that affected cosmonauts during space station missions. In addition, solar panels returned, allowing the Soyuz-T to fly up to 11 days independently as well as a redesigned propulsion system, the KTDU-426. Finally, it could at last carry three cosmonauts with pressure suits.

Missions
Soyuz T-1 (uncrewed test, launched 1979)
Soyuz T-2
Soyuz T-3
Soyuz T-4
Soyuz T-5
Soyuz T-6
Soyuz T-7
Soyuz T-8
Soyuz T-9
Soyuz T-10-1
Soyuz T-10
Soyuz T-11
Soyuz T-12
Soyuz T-13
Soyuz T-14
Soyuz T-15 (launched 1986)

External links

 Russia New Russian spaceship will be able to fly to Moon - space corp
 RSC Energia: Concept Of Russian Manned Space Navigation Development
Mir Hardware Heritage
David S.F. Portree, Mir Hardware Heritage, NASA RP-1357, 1995
Mir Hardware Heritage (wikisource)
 Information on Soyuz spacecraft 
OMWorld's ASTP Docking Trainer Page
NASA - Russian Soyuz TMA Spacecraft Details
Space Adventures circum-lunar mission - details

Crewed spacecraft
Soyuz program
Vehicles introduced in 1979